Kai Kantola (born September 11, 1987) is a Finnish-American professional ice hockey forward who currently plays for KalPa of the Finnish Liiga.

Playing career
Kantola was raised in Raleigh, North Carolina and first played midget hockey with the East Coast Eagles. Kantola, of Finnish descent, played the U-18 level for Kiekkoreipas for a season before continuing his junior career in America with the Fargo-Moorhead Jets of the North American Hockey League. After two seasons with the Jets, Kantola committed to play collegiate hockey with Bowling Green State University.

Following completion of his full four-year tenure with the Falcons, Kantola played 2 games to end the 2009-10 season with the Norfolk Admirals of the American Hockey League. As an undrafted free agent, Kantola opted to continue his career in the familiar surroundings of Finland, signing his first professional contract with Ilves of the SM-liiga on June 1, 2010.

After four seasons with Ilves, and improving his points totals in each season whilst providing a power based style, Kantola moved to Liiga rival, the Espoo Blues on a two-year contract on April 16, 2014.  Kantola was selected as the Best Player of September 2014 in the SM-liiga.

References

External links

1987 births
Bowling Green Falcons men's ice hockey players
Ilves players
Living people
Norfolk Admirals players
American people of Finnish descent
American men's ice hockey right wingers
Finnish ice hockey players
Espoo Blues players
HIFK (ice hockey) players
KooKoo players
KalPa players